The 3-Länder-Tour der Sparkassen Versicherung was a multi-stage road bicycle race held around three Länder of Germany: Hessen, Thuringia and Baden-Württemberg. From 2005 until 2007 it was part of the UCI Europe Tour, being organised as a 2.1 race.

The race was previously known as Hessen-Rundfahrt, taking place in the Bundesland of Hessen, but in 2006 it expanded its territory to take place in the states of Thuringia and Baden-Württemberg.

Winners

References

External links
 Official website

Cycle races in Germany
UCI Europe Tour races
Recurring sporting events established in 1982
1982 establishments in West Germany
Defunct cycling races in Germany
Recurring sporting events disestablished in 2007
Sports competitions in Hesse
Sports competitions in Thuringia
Sports competitions in Baden-Württemberg
2007 disestablishments in Germany